Paul Melko (born May 22, 1968) is an American science fiction writer whose work has appeared in Realms of Fantasy, Asimov's Science Fiction, Strange Horizons, and Live Without a Net.

His first professional story appeared in Realms of Fantasy in 2002.  His first novel, Singularity's Ring, appeared from Tor Books in February 2008. He lives near Columbus, Ohio.

Bibliography

 Singularity's Ring (2008) novel  
 Ten Sigmas & Other Unlikelihoods (2008) collection 
 The Walls of the Universe (2009) novel  
 Broken Universe (2012) novel, sequel to "The Walls of the Universe"

Awards and nominations
 2009: Won the Locus Award for Best First Novel for the novel Singularity's Ring
 2009: Won the Compton Crook Award for the novel Singularity's Ring
 2006: Nominated for Hugo Award for Best Novella, Nebula Award for Best Novella, and Theodore Sturgeon Memorial Award for "The Walls of the Universe" (Asimov's Science Fiction, April/May 2006)
 2006: Won the Asimov's Readers Poll Award for "The Walls of the Universe" (Asimov's Science Fiction, April/May 2006)

Notes

External links
 Paul's blog
 Paul's website
 Interview w/ Paul Melko at World in the Satin Bag blog
 GGG#310: Paul Melko at Geek’s Guide to the Galaxy podcast

1968 births
Living people
21st-century American novelists
American male novelists
American science fiction writers
American male short story writers
21st-century American short story writers
21st-century American male writers